Putharet Khongrak (born 9 October 1994) is a Paralympian athlete from Thailand competing mainly in category T54 sprint events. He represented Thailand at the 2020 Summer Paralympics and won two bronze medals in the 1500 metres and  5000 metres event.

Notes

External links
 

1994 births
Living people
Putharet Khongrak
Putharet Khongrak
Putharet Khongrak
Paralympic medalists in athletics (track and field)
Medalists at the 2020 Summer Paralympics
Athletes (track and field) at the 2020 Summer Paralympics
Putharet Khongrak